Heinz Prechter (January 19, 1942 – July 6, 2001) was a German-born American entrepreneur who founded the American Sunroof Company (ASC). He also founded Heritage Network, Inc., made up of companies in transportation, hospitality, and communications. He was an entrepreneur, community leader, and philanthropist. He was also a close friend and strong fundraiser for the Bush Family.

Early life
Born in 1942 in Kleinhöbing, Germany, Prechter began his automotive career at the age of 13 as an apprentice in automotive trim, tool and die making, and coach and body building.  Germany has had a strong apprentice system in skilled trades, enabling students to gain practical work experience and entry into valuable jobs. After completing his studies at the Berufs-Oberschule in Nuremberg, Prechter furthered his education at Nuremberg's Ohm Polytechnic Engineering School.

During his studies, Prechter gained a wide range of practical experience working for a number of German companies, including Faunwerke (a truck and military equipment supplier), Siemens (an electronics firm), and Deutz (a diesel engine manufacturer).

In 1963, he came to the U.S. as a 19-year-old exchange student. While studying Business Administration and English at San Francisco State College, he began installing sunroofs – then a virtually unknown product in the US.

Fifteen months later, in 1965, Prechter founded the American Sunroof Company (now ASC Incorporated) in Los Angeles. He spent US$764 on tools, built a workbench made from an old door covered with aluminum, and found a sewing machine at a junkyard. His one-man enterprise soon became well known for "custom" sunroofs, and his creative approach to supporting the development of specialty vehicles for the film industry.

American Sunroof Corporation
ASC was a supplier of highly engineered and designed roof systems, body systems and other specialty-vehicle systems for the world's automakers. Formerly headquartered in Southgate, Michigan, the company employed approximately 1,000 employees at facilities throughout the U.S.

In addition to ASC, Prechter founded Heritage Network Inc., a group of Michigan companies involved in the transportation, hospitality, and communications industries. His Heritage Network group included a weekly newspaper chain (one of the largest in the state of Michigan), a real estate development company, and a beef cattle business. In early 1997, he created Prechter Holdings, which owned the ASC and Heritage businesses.

Heinz Prechter was recognized for his entrepreneurial accomplishments, broad community involvement, and political achievements. He was named Entrepreneur of the Year by the Harvard Business Club and received the Automotive Hall of Fame's Automotive Industry Leader of the Year award. He served on many community and corporate boards, including those of Detroit Renaissance, Comerica Bank and ThyssenKrupp's automotive supervisory board. He also served as a fundraiser for the Bush Family and was a friend.

Death
He died by suicide on July 6, 2001, after dealing with bipolar disorder and bouts of depression for most of his adult life. Seven hundred people gathered for Prechter's funeral. The eulogy was delivered by his good friend, Michigan Governor John Engler, and Donald W. Thurlow, Heritage Media Publisher. He was survived by his wife and twin children.

President George W. Bush issued a presidential press release saying, "Laura and I were saddened to hear of the death of Heinz Prechter".

Legacy and honors
His widow Waltraud "Wally" Prechter established a foundation in her husband's memory in October 2001. The Heinz C. Prechter Bipolar Research Fund at The University of Michigan Health System, is directed to medical research — especially in the fields of psychiatric genetics, pediatric bipolar disorder, neuroimaging and neurosciences — to help find cures for bipolar disorder. In 2003 and 2004, the Prechter Fund awarded grants totaling almost $2 million to seven different universities to advance medical research in these fields.

On October 5, 2004 Prechter was inducted posthumously into the Automotive Hall of Fame.

See also
Distinguished German-American of the Year

References

External links
The Heinz C. Prechter Bipolar Research Fund
Distinguished German-American of the Year 1992 Award
Heinz Prechter: Eulogy for a Pioneer
Heinz Prechter memoriam

1942 births
2001 deaths
German emigrants to the United States
People with bipolar disorder
People in the automobile industry
San Francisco State University alumni
2001 suicides